If You Tickle Us is a UK Jewish blog and Twitter account run by a Haredi blogger which mainly covers issues concerning the Haredi communities of Stamford Hill and Golders Green.

Coverage of sexual abuse scandal 

The blog's popularity flourished following allegations of a planned cover-up by the Union of Orthodox Hebrew Congregations Beth Din of sexual abuse committed by one of its prominent rabbis. The blog provided a regular update of the developing scandal, which was used by a number of media sources such as the Jewish Chronicle and the Times of Israel.

If You Tickle Us made headlines again after a high court decided that Google must provide Rabbi Aaron Halpern with the identifying details, such as the IP address, of the blogger behind the blog If You Tickle Us.

References

External links 
If You Tickle Us

British news websites
Jewish bloggers